Koutammakou, the Land of the Batammariba is a cultural landscape designated in 2004 as a UNESCO World Heritage Site in northern Togo. The area features traditional mud tower-houses which remain the preferred style of living. The traditional mud houses are known as a national symbol of Togo. Many of the mud houses have two floors and some of them have a flat roof.

In 2008, to complete the inscription of the site to World Heritage,  the Department of Intangible Cultural Heritage (ICH) of UNESCO, headed by Rieks Smeets, set up the «Safeguarding of the Cultural Intangible Heritage of Batammariba», from the 2003 Convention. The goal was to promote sustainability in Intergenerational transmission and preservation of skills and knowledge in all the essential areas of their culture, such as : manufacture of everyday and ceremonial objects, traditional healing and useful plants, takyentas construction, dance, music, archery, oral traditions, promotion of tourism respecting local traditions,  mapping sacred areas, accumulation of data on the intangible cultural heritage and creation of access to it, recordings, films and photos…. Overall, teaching the ditammari, language of Batammariba in primary schools and education of youth in the intangible cultural heritage  (distribution of textbooks).

This program was coordinated by the Ministry of Culture and the Ministry of Primary Education of Togo, led by minister Angèle Dola Akofa Aguigah. Dominique Sewane, whose groundwork and her research and publications on the Batammaribas’ ceremonial life, had an important role in the designation.

From 19 to 24 October October 2018, UNESCO organized an emergency mission to assess the damage allegedly caused by the August 2018 rains in Koutammakou on habitat and on the intangible heritage. The report was prepared by three international experts: Ishanlosen Odiaua, Dominique Sewane and Franck Ogou.

History

Bibliography 

 Philippe et Marie Huet, Koutammakou : portraits en pays somba, Nord Bénin, Hesse, Saint-Claude-de-Diray, 2012, 155 p.
 Albert-Marie Maurice, Atakora : Otiau, Otammari, Osari, peuples du Nord-Bénin (1950), Académie des sciences d'outre-mer, Paris, 1986, 481 p.
 Paul Mercier, Tradition, changement, histoire. Les “Somba” du Dahomey septentrional, Anthropos, Paris, 1968, 538 p. (texte remanié d'une thèse)
 Suzanne Preston-Blier, The Anatomy of Architecture – Ontology and metaphor in Batammaliba architectural expression, Cambridge University Press, Cambridge, 1987, 314 p.
 Dominique Sewane Rapport final en vue de l’inscription du Koutammakou, pays des Batammariba au Togo sur la liste des sites classés du Patrimoine mondial de l’Unesco, décembre 2002, 102 pages
 Dominique Sewane Rapport de coordination du Programme de sauvegarde du Patrimoine culturel immatériel des Batammariba du Koutammakou – Première Phase (novembre 2008- novembre 2009)
 Dominique Sewane, La nuit des grands morts : l’initiée et l’épouse chez les Tamberma du Togo (préface de Jean Malaurie), Economica, Paris, 2002, 272  p. + pl. (texte remanié d'une thèse)
 Dominique Sewane, Le souffle du mort : la tragédie de la mort chez les Batãmmariba du Togo, Bénin, Plon, « Collection Terre humaine », 2007, 849 p. + pl., 2020, collection Terre Humaine, Plon (prix Robert Cornevin)
 Dominique Sewane, Les Batãmmariba, le peuple voyant : carnets d’une ethnologue, éditions de La Martinière, Paris, 192 p.
 Dominique Sewane, « Rites et pensée des Batammariba » pour les écoles primaires du Togo, Ministère des Enseignements Primaire Secondaire et de l’Alphabétisation duTogo, Patrimoine Culturel Immatériel de l’UNESCO, éditions Haho, Lomé (Togo), Éditions Haho, Togo, 2009 (in Programme de sauvegarde du Patrimoine immatériel des Batammariba – Unesco-Japan)
 Dominique Sewane, Bantéé N’Koué, Bakoukalébé Kpakou, Koutammakou - Lieux sacrés, Préface de Jean Malaurie, éditions Hesse, 2018,
 Jean Pierre Vallat (dir.), Le Togo : lieux de mémoire et sites de conscience, L’Harmattan, Paris, 2013, 204 p. + pl.

References

External links
UNESCO Koutammakou Site
https://www.canal-u.tv/video/fmsh/l_aventure_terre_humaine.30929
http://agoras.typepad.fr/regard_eloigne/dominique-sewane/

World Heritage Sites in Togo